Roberto Esser dos Reis, is a Brazilian ichthyologist, professor and Curator of Fishes at the Pontifical Catholic University of Rio Grande do Sul. Among other duties, Reis has been working at the University of São Paulo, Brazil, the University of Michigan, Ann Arbor, and the University of Central Florida, Orlando, Florida, United States. Most of his research as an ichthyologist regards different types of South American catfish. He is also chair for South America of the Freshwater Fish Specialist Group, Species Survival Commission, and advises the IUCN on the biological aspects of the conservation of threatened species.

Reis authored more than 120 original journal papers, and four books. Reis is Chief Editor of the Checklist of Freshwater Fishes from Central and South America (CLOFFSCA), and past President of the Brazilian Ichthyological Society. Reis has discovered and described more than 100 fish species.

See also
:Category:Taxa named by Roberto Esser dos Reis

References
 Curriculum Vitæ – Brazilian National Council for Scientific and Technological Development. 

Brazilian scientists
Brazilian ichthyologists
Living people
University of Michigan faculty
Year of birth missing (living people)